The Afro-American Life Insurance Company was a historic business based in Jacksonville, Florida. It was founded in 1901 by Abraham Lincoln Lewis and his business associates. The company specialized in helping Black Americans obtain life insurance and mortgages.

Background
Up until the creation of this insurance company, black Americans found it difficult to purchase life insurance, which was unaffordable to most blacks at the time. The insurance company also served as a financial institution as well. The company is responsible for the creation of American Beach in Nassau County, Florida.

With strong competition from other insurance companies in the mid-20th century, the Afro-American Life Insurance Company closed in 1990.  The building located at 101 E. Union Street, which housed the company has been renovated and served as the offices for Congresswoman Corrine Brown and other businesses.

References 

Financial services companies established in 1901
Financial services companies disestablished in 1990
Buildings and structures in Jacksonville, Florida
Insurance companies based in Florida
Life insurance companies of the United States
Companies based in Jacksonville, Florida
Defunct companies based in Florida
1901 establishments in Florida
1990 disestablishments in Florida
African-American history in Jacksonville, Florida